Jacob Hookem (born 4 October 2002) is an English professional rugby league footballer who plays as a  or  for the Castleford Tigers in the Betfred Super League.

He has previously played for Hull F.C. in the Super League, and spent time on loan from Hull at Whitehaven RLFC in the Betfred Championship.

In 13th August 2021 he made his Hull FC début in the Super League against the Catalans Dragons.

References

External links
Hull FC profile

2002 births
Living people
Bradford Bulls players
Castleford Tigers players
English rugby league players
Hull F.C. players
Rugby league players from Kingston upon Hull
Whitehaven R.L.F.C. players